The National Shrine of Saint Jude adjoining the Church of Our Lady of Mount Carmel in Faversham, England, is a Roman Catholic shrine to Saint Jude and a place of pilgrimage for Catholics and other Christians in the United Kingdom and other countries. It is located on Tanners Street, to the west of the town centre. The building dates from 1861, it became a church in 1937 and the shrine itself was built in 1955. The shrine was founded by the Order of Carmelites and it lies within the Faversham Conservation Area. In 2020, the Shrine was given five stars by the new guide 'Britain's Pilgrim Places' produced by the British Pilgrimage Trust. The authors particularly emphasised that.."the Shrine is a common meeting ground between Anglicans and Catholics since there was little historical and cultural interest in Jude during Christianity's most difficult years. He is certainly a more productive figure to contemplate than the Reformation martyrs of either side. For that reason alone this Shrine deserves the highest recommendation".

History

Foundation
The oldest building on the site, Whitefriars, houses the Carmelite community. It is next to the church and the shrine, and is a Grade II listed building.

The building of the Church of Our Lady of Mount Carmel dates from 1861. It was originally built to house a Quaker School for the girls of the workers at the local gunpowder factories. In 1907, the school closed. In 1910, the building was bought by East Kent Cinemas and it became The Empire Picture Hall. In 1926, the Order of Carmelites moved to Faversham and took care of the parish. In 1936, the cinema closed and the Carmelites bought it. In 1937, the building became a church. To the church the Carmelites they added a reredos triptych by Edward Ardizzone.

Construction
In 1955, the shrine of Saint Jude was built alongside the church. The building housing the shrine was specifically constructed as a site of pilgrimage. On 28 October 1955, the shrine was dedicated. The Bishop of Southwark Cyril Cowderoy, with the Prior General of the Carmelite Order, the Prior of Aylesford, performed the dedication in the presence of many other priests and friars. Bishop Cyril described the place as "a jewel for the diocese".

Developments
Attached to the Shrine is an office, information centre, and welcome centre which serve the many pilgrims who visit, write, or send in their prayers. The venue also holds the distribution office for St Albert's Press (which is the publishing arm of the British Province of Carmelites).

In 2004 a fire broke out in the shrine chapel, destroying the murals and damaging much of the other artwork. The windows and ceramics could be repaired, but the murals had to be replaced. The decision was made to install icons depicting saints inspired by the Carmelite Rule of Saint Albert, in commemoration of the 8th centenary of the Carmelite Rule in 2007. The icons were written by Sister Petra Clare, a Benedictine hermit living in Scotland. 

In 2008, the roles of chaplain and manager were separated. The management of the site was handled by an office manager, and then later the current Development Manager and friar took on the role as chaplain to run the spiritual side. 

In 2014, the Guild of Saint Jude was founded. It was set up to foster worship, for members to be able to support and share in the mission of the Carmelite Family by prayer and material resources; and to raise awareness and encourage pilgrimages to the National Shrine.

During the pandemic of 2020/21, the Shrine of Saint Jude offered a number of online initiatives and developments, including 'Praying with Saint Jude at home' and the Virtual Feast of Saint Jude. These were initially daily, but became weekly, reflections written by Carmelite friars, lay people and other people associated with the Shrine, including the Jesuit scholar Fr Nicholas King.

Interior
The corridor between the church and shrine has a number of stained glass windows by the artist Richard Joseph King, depicting important figures in the tradition of the Carmelite Order. There is the window of Saint Simon Stock, a Kentish man who became Prior General of the Order in the 1250s and who died in Bordeaux, France, in 1265. The other windows are of Saint Brocard, the prophet Elisha and the prophet Elijah.

The statue of the Apostle Jude in the inner shrine beyond the Shrine Chapel. It is fifteenth-century gilt and polychrome wood, and was a gift from Mr & Mrs Murphy, given in memory of their sons Matthew and Michael both of whom died in action in the Second World War.

The Shrine, the mosaic apse, ironwork and exterior frieze in mosaic were designed by Michael Leigh A.R.C.A., who worked on various churches and some of the mosaics in Westminster Cathedral.

The reliquary which stands in the inner shrine is called the Augsberg Reliquary, and is a modern copy of a silver monstrance from 1547. The reliquary has been modified to display the relic, a bone fragment of Saint Jude.

There are three designs from the artist Adam Kossowski: holy water stoops at the entrance, and three ceramic plaques.

There are icons are of: Saint Albert giving the Carmelite 'way of life' (Rule document) to Saint Brocard on Mount Carmel; Blessed John Soreth and Blessed Françoise d'Amboise; Saint Elias Kuriakos Chavara and Blessed Isidore Bakanja; Blessed Titus Brandsma and Saint Edith Stein.

Shrine

Shrine Directors
 Br Anthony McGreal, O.Carm: 1955 - 1965
 Fr Conleth Doyle, O.Carm: 1965 - 1975
 Fr Bonaventure Fitz-Gerald, O.Carm: 1975 - 1985
 Fr Richard Hearne, O.Carm: 1985 - 1987
 Fr Adrian Wilde, O.Carm: 1993 - 1996
 Fr David Fox, O.Carm: 1987 - 1995
 Fr Alphonsus Brennan, O.Carm: 1996 - 1999
 Fr Kevin Alban, O.Carm: 1999 - 2002
 Fr Francis Kemsley, O.Carm: 2002 - 2005
 Fr Brendan Grady, O.Carm: 2005 - 2008

Chaplains
 Fr Piet Wijngaard, O.Carm: 2008 - 2014
 Fr Michael Manning, O.Carm: 2014 - 2016
 Fr Brendan O'Grady, O.Carm: 2016 - present

Societies of Prayer

Before the Second World War, three ‘Societies of Prayer’ were established, for Saint Jude, the Infant Jesus and the Little Flower. The societies are a way for people to express their faith, participate in the Carmelite devotions, and support the ministry of the shrine.

The Society of the Infant Jesus is affiliated to the Shrine of the Infant Jesus cared for by the Discalced Carmelite brothers in Prague, where the original statue of Jesus has been revered since the 17th century.

The Society of the Little Flower at Faversham pre-dates the Society of the Little Flower and is based in Horsham and operated by the Curia of the Carmelite Order. It is named after Thérèse of Lisieux.

Events
Two major events occur at the Shrine during the year:
 Summer Celebration (end of May)
 Feast of Saint Jude (October)

Membership
The National Shrine of Saint Jude is a member of:
 Churches Visitor and Tourism Association
 Faversham Area Tourism Association
 Green Pilgrimage Network

Newsletter
The Shrine produces the Carmelite News four times a year. The newsletter updates subscribers on the British Province of the Carmelites and the shrine and is written by the Prior Provincial. The newsletter is sent worldwide.

References

External links

National Shrine of Saint Jude
Shrine News Blog
Parish of Our Lady of Mount Carmel, Faversham

Roman Catholic national shrines
Catholic pilgrimage sites
Roman Catholic shrines in the United Kingdom
Carmelite churches in the United Kingdom
Roman Catholic churches in Kent
Faversham
Carmelite monasteries in England
1955 establishments in England
Roman Catholic churches completed in 1937